Coleodactylus is a genus of South American geckos.

Classification
Coleodactylus is placed in the family Sphaerodactylidae and contains the following species which are recognized as being valid.

Coleodactylus brachystoma  – Goias gecko
Coleodactylus elizae 
Coleodactylus meridionalis  – meridian gecko
Coleodactylus natalensis  – Natal pygmy gecko
Coleodactylus septentrionalis  – Ilha Maracá gecko

The species formerly known as Coleodactylus amazonicus has been transferred to the genus Chatogekko.

References

 
Lizard genera
Taxa named by Hampton Wildman Parker